= Gaminger Initiative =

Transeuropean officers' and reservists' association founded in 1989

The Gaminger Initiative Europe is a transeuropean officers' and reservists’ association founded in 1989. The current member countries are Germany, Italy, Croatia, Poland, Switzerland, Slovakia, Slovenia, Czech Republic, Hungary, Northern Macedonia, Romania, Moldova and Albania. It is a non-governmental, non-political, non-profit organization.

== Purpose ==
The Gaminger Initiative Europe is a joint platform of its officially recognized officers' and reservists' associations, which works on a level below politics and the armed forces, towards national and European defence readiness and collective security. The focus is on the role of reservists in the increasingly professionalized armed forces and the role of the armed forces in Europe as part of the EU and NATO or in other European countries. The Gaminger Initiative Europe aims to help ensure that the greatly downsized armed forces do not lose touch with society and that the specialists and reservists these armed forces rely upon can be trained and deployed meaningfully.

== History ==
The predecessor of the Gaminger Initiative Europe was founded in 1989 as the fireside chats by a private initiative of Colonel Charles Ott (Switzerland), Colonel Professor Armin A. Steinkamm (Germany), and Colonel Volker Zimmermann (Austria) in the monastery Kartause Gaming near St. Polten. The original aim of the Gaminger Initiative Europe was to bring together the military and reservist associations of Austria, Switzerland, and Germany with the new military and reservist associations of Central and Eastern European countries that were formed after the political changes in 1989 to create a trusting basis for mutual information and cooperation. In 1995 the working group was institutionalized with its own presidium and general secretariat as the Gaminger Initiative. In 2002, the Gaminger Initiative was officially recognized by CIOR. While both organizations work closely together, they are independent and autonomous in their respective areas of responsibility. Since 2004, the Gaminger Initiative has increasingly focused on European security policy and military affairs. Since then, the member states have met on a biannual basis. The meetings are attended by representatives of the individual national associations and authorities as well as particularly invited speakers. Since 2004, the Gaminger Initiative (GI) is focusing more on European security policy and military affairs. Because of this the name of organisation from Gaminger Initiative changed to Gaminger Initiative Europe (GIE) since 2024.

== Organization ==
The central executive body of the Gaminger Initiative Europe is the Presidium, which consists of a president and two vice presidents. Traditionally, the positions of the vice president are occupied by the future president and the former president. This ensures continuity in the operations and work of the initiative. Elections are held for two years at a time. The current Presidium is formed by the President Lieutenant Colonel Dr. Sebastian Söllner (Germany), and the two Vice Presidents Lieutenant Colonel Nevenka Kovač (Croatia) and Lieutenant Colonel Philipp Leo (Switzerland).
